Evidence is an album by saxophonist Vincent Herring which was recorded in 1990 and released on Orrin Keepnews' Landmark label the following year.

Reception

The AllMusic review by Scott Yanow stated "The underrated but talented hard bop altoist Vincent Herring is in excellent form on the quintet date Evidence. While Herring's tone is as usual a bit reminiscent of Cannonball Adderley, he comes up with many fresh ideas and swinging phrases on the eight songs ... Easily recommended to fans of Herring's straight-ahead playing".

Track listing
All compositions by Vincent Herring except where noted
 "Mr. Wizard" – 5:19
 "I Sing a Song" (Tex Allen) – 8:10
 "Stars Fell on Alabama" (Frank Perkins, Mitchell Parish) – 6:20
 "Voyage" (Kenny Barron) – 5:55
 "Hindsight" (Cedar Walton) – 7:35 Additional track on CD release
 "Never Forget" – 6:32
 "Evidence" (Thelonious Monk) – 7:46
 "Soul-Leo" (Mulgrew Miller) – 8:40

Personnel
Vincent Herring - alto saxophone 
Wallace Roney – trumpet (tracks 1, 2, 4, 5, 7 & 8)
Mulgrew Miller – piano
Ira Coleman – bass 
Carl Allen – drums

References

Landmark Records albums
Vincent Herring albums
1991 albums
Albums produced by Orrin Keepnews